Clearbranch (also Clear Branch) is an unincorporated community in Unicoi County, Tennessee, United States.

History
William Josiah Tilson (1871–1949), United States Federal Court judge, was born in Clear Branch.

Notes

Unincorporated communities in Unicoi County, Tennessee
Unincorporated communities in Tennessee